Fourcroy  may refer to:
 Antoine François Fourcroy (1755-1809), a French chemist
 Charles-René de Fourcroy (1715-1791), a French military engineer, member of the Academy of Sciences, author of the Tableau poléométrique
 Cape Fourcroy, a cape located at the western tip of Bathurst Island, Northern Territory, Australia
 13180 Fourcroy, a main-belt asteroid discovered in 1996